Mike Dahlquist (born June 23, 1987), better known as Mike Diva, is an American film director, special effects artist, musician and YouTuber.

Career 
Based in Southern California, Diva began experimenting with video equipment at age 13. As a piano and cello player, he performed in several orchestras and was the lead singer for the band "Vyncent Flaw". His YouTube channel is eclectic – a mix of parodies, skits and music videos.

In 2011, Diva's "Sexy Sax Man" video featuring saxophonist Sergio Flores went viral. In 2012, Diva collaborated with fellow YouTube stars Joe Penna, Tay Zonday, Corridor Digital and DeStorm Power to create the YouTube group and channel BAMMO. Diva also appeared that year as Bruce Lee in episode 25, "Clint Eastwood vs. Bruce Lee", of the web series Epic Rap Battles of History. In 2014, Diva was listed on New Media Rockstars Top 100 Channels, ranked at number 77. In February 2016, Diva's trap remix of the 1989 film "Special Friends: Starring You On Kazoo" went viral.

Diva has produced official music videos for 3OH!3, Kill the Noise, Peter Pepper, The M Machine, Mindless Self Indulgence, Savant, and, most recently, Lil Nas X, Run the Jewels, and Doja Cat. Most of his music is on SoundCloud.

In 2017, Mike co-wrote and directed a stylized horror spot for Halo Top Creamery titled "Eat The Ice Cream," produced by Lord Danger. The commercial was awarded AdWeek's Top 10 Ads of 2017, and put him on the map as an up-and-coming commercial director. He has since worked with clients including Yelp, Microsoft, LA Metro, GSN, and with celebrities including The Lonely Island and Steve Aoki.

2016 election videos 
In June 2016, Diva's video Japanese Donald Trump Commercialトランプ2016 gained international attention, with some 8 million views on Facebook and almost 300,000 views on YouTube in its first 24 hours.  The video masquerades as a Japanese commercial that seemingly promotes the presumptive Republican presidential candidate Donald Trump. Slate described the work as  "a dizzying, sorbet-hued phantasmagoria that gestures toward the coming end times."

Diva's intent was to "seem obnoxiously pro-Trump" while doing the opposite, with the production quality so good that viewers would ask: "Why would a Japanese ad agency make this?" Indeed, many early online comments mistook the video for a genuine ad, despite Trump's being (briefly) depicted as giving a Nazi salute amid swastikas and ultimately transforming into an earth-destroying robot. The video was shot over a month and a half with virtually no budget and stars the cosplayer and wig stylist known as sushimonstuh. Diva talked about the video when interviewed with KABC-TV.

On August 11, 2016, Diva released a video poking fun of Democratic presidential candidate Hillary Clinton for the Super Deluxe channel. The video depicted a fictionalized Clinton attempting to connect with the millennial generation by various internet memes such as Dat Boi, Damn Daniel, and Nyan Cat, as well as performing the dab and telling her supporters to "Pokémon Go to the polls". The video was said to be paid for by "Hillary for America", although that was not the case. In an interview with Creativity, Diva explained that the purpose of his video was to show that "Hillary is just kind of a dorky mom, and it's so hilariously cringey when she tries to appeal to a younger audience,".

Commercial work 
Diva has directed commercials for clients including Halo Top Creamery, Yelp, Microsoft, Los Angeles County Metropolitan Transportation Authority (LA Metro), GSN, Capcom's Devil May Cry 5 and others, with celebrities including Danny Trejo and Steve Aoki.

Diva's dystopian robot nightmare Halo Top advert "Eat The Ice Cream" made headlines in Adweek, AdAge, IndieWire, Munchies and Gizmodo for its spooky, bizarre approach to selling ice cream. Mike wrote, directed, did post production, edited, and did music for the branded content, which went on to win a number of awards including AdWeek's Top 10 Ads of 2017.

For the Los Angeles County Metropolitan Transportation Authority (known as Metro), Diva wrote, directed, edited, and composed the music for two music video themed "Metro Manners" campaigns featuring anime-inspired character Super Kind, played by actress and YouTube celebrity Anna Akana. The campaigns included online videos and print etiquette posters to raise awareness about proper transit etiquette onboard Metro buses and trains, with Super Kind persistently battling the antics of Rude Dude. The first campaign, which aired in 2017, included three spots: Eating, Seat Hogging, and Aisle Blocking. The second campaign, released in 2018, included No Loud Music, and Wait Your Turn, featuring Danny Trejo.

On July 16, 2020, after a viral Twitter post in which a woman criticized a "Cartoon Network after hours" video, (an excerpt from the Adult Swim show Off the Air, which Diva directed) Diva responded, explaining that he made the video "cos at the time I -thought- it would be funny to make music outta cartoon babies (that are clearly having fun being slammed around). sorry it upset you, but there is no deeper meaning here. I'm just a guy that made an absurd video in poor taste".

Saturday Night Live 

In 2021, Diva moved to New York City and began directing video shorts for Saturday Night Live. His first short was a Squid Game country music video segment.

Personal life 
Diva grew up with a brother in Sacramento, California. He briefly dated Casey Grim from A Couple of N3rds. Later, he moved to Los Angeles. He was dating Melissa Melancon from Smosh. It’s unknown if he’s in a relationship now.
In terms of religion, Diva describes himself as "Atheist leaning agnostic". Diva is half Korean and half Swedish.

Awards and nominations

References

External links
 
 

1987 births
American film directors
American music video directors
American people of Korean descent
American people of Swedish descent
American YouTubers
Living people
Special effects people